The Scout and Guide movement in Morocco is served by
 Fédération Nationale du Scoutisme Marocain, member of the World Organization of the Scout Movement
 Although Morocco does have  Guiding organization, work towards World Association of Girl Guides and Girl Scouts membership recognition remains unclear

Non-aligned Scout organizations
Morocco has a large non-aligned Scout movement; known are the following ten organizations:

 Association Scouts Arabe Sociale
 Association Scouts du Maroc
 Mouvement du Scoutisme marocain
 Organisation du Scout Populaire
 Organisation du Scoutisme marocain musulman
 Organisation Scout Atlas
 Organisation Scout National
 Organisation Scoutisme Mohamedia Marocaine
 Organisation Scouts sans frontières
 Scoutisme Unifié au Maroc

International Scouting units in Morocco
Boy Scouts of America,served by the Transatlantic Council in Rabat
Scouts et Guides de France operates groups in Tunis and Rabat.

See also

References

Morocco
Scouting in Morocco